Theo Kelchtermans (born 27 June 1943 in Peer, Belgium) is a Belgian politician.

Biography
Kelchtermans was born on 27 June 1943 in Peer, Belgium.
Kelchtermans graduated with a degree in applied psychology at the Catholic University of Leuven.
He worked as a consultant at the CLB center of Neerpelt. He was from 1975 to 1985 member of the Regional Economic Council for Flanders (GERV).
From 1974 to 1981, he served as county councilor in Limburg.
Kelchtermans serve from 1980 to 2013 mayor of Peer, where he served on the town council from 1977 to 1980.
In 2013, he left the position as mayor of Peer, after which he was succeeded by Steven Matheï.

Parliamentary career
He had a long parliamentary career. From 1981 to 1991, he served as a member of the Chamber of Representatives. Then, he serves as a member of the Senate from 1991 to 1995 and 1999 and 2003. After his second term as senator, he served again as a Representative. In the time from December 1981 to May 1995, he served a dual mandate that allowed him to also sit on the Flemish Council. The Flemish Council from October 21, 1980, the successor to the Cultural Council for the Dutch Cultural Community, which was installed on December 7, 1971, and was the forerunner of the current Flemish Parliament. At the first direct elections to the Flemish Parliament on May 21, 1995, he was elected in the constituency Hasselt Tongeren-Maaseik. He stayed for one month the Flemish Parliament until he again took the oath as Flemish minister on June 20, 1995.

Between 1985 and 1999, he also held various ministerial posts in the Flemish Executive (1985–1995) and the Government of Flanders (1995–1999). From 1985 to 1988, he was regional minister of Education in the Government under Prime Minister Gaston Geens. In 1988, he was community Minister for Employment, Education and the Civil Service in the third term government of Gaston Geens. From 1988 to 1992, he was regional minister for Public Works, Transport and Planning in the fourth term government under Geens. From 1992 to 1995, he was regional minister of Public Works, Planning and Home Affairs in the second term of Luc Van den Brande. From 1995 to 1999, he was Flemish Minister for Environment and Employment.

Timeline of career
1974–1981 County Councillor Limburg
1977–2012 Councillor Peer
1977–1980 Peer Ships
1980–2012 Mayor Peer
1981–1991 Member of Parliament
1981–1995 Member Flemish Council
1985–1988 Community Minister of Education and Training
1988 Community Minister for Employment, Education and Civil Service
1988–1992 Community Minister for the Environment, Nature Conservation and Country Furnishings
1991–1995 Senator
1992–1995 Flemish Minister for Public Works, Planning and Home Affairs
1995 Flemish Parliament
1995–1999 Flemish Minister for Environment and Employment
1999–2003 Senator
2003–2007 Member of Parliament

Honours 
 2007 : Knight grand Cross in the Order of Leopold II.
 1999: grand Officer in the Order of Leopold.

References

1943 births
Living people
Recipients of the Grand Cross of the Order of Leopold II
20th-century Belgian politicians
21st-century Belgian politicians
KU Leuven alumni